Amos Tamam (born September 6, 1977) is an Israeli actor.

Biography 
Amos Tamam grew up in Ramla in a traditional Jewish family of Tunisian descent and served in the IDF as a fighter in the paratroopers' brigade.

Career

Cinema 
Tamam also participated in the film "Little Heroes" directed by Itai Lev. In 2006, he starred in "Three Mothers" (directed by Dina Zvi Riklis), "Nuzhat Al-Fuad" (directed by Jad Ne'eman), "A Movie of Wanderers" (directed by David Darzi and Maayan Rogel) and "Now or Never" ( TV movie on "Network").

In 2011 he starred in the movie "One Column to Dream". In 2013, he starred in the action film "Bayonet" directed by Emanuel Nakash.

In 2016, he starred in the lead role, Adi, in the film "Good Boy Jerusalem", a romantic comedy by Ran Appelberg directed by Roi Florentin, alongside Meital Gal Suissa, Mali Levy and Evelyn the Redeemer. That same year he starred in the film The Wedding Plan directed by Rama Burstein.

In 2017, he voiced the main character in the Hebrew version of the animated film "Ferdinand". In 2018, he appeared in the lead role in the film by Erez Mizrahi and Sahar Shavit "Halomim".

Television 
In 2004, he began acting in the yes musical drama series - "Our Song", in which he played for two seasons. He also hosted the educational television program "Sabers - Read Will Succeed" to encourage reading among teenagers.

In 2007, he played a football player in the series "Arranged" on Channel 2 as part of "Rainbow Broadcasts". In 2008, he played the character of Amir, a young divorcee from religious Zionism, in the series Srugim ("Knitted") in Yes, and continued to appear in it in the second season (2009–2010) and the third (2011). In 2010–2011 he played with me in the series "Asfur".

In 2011, Tamm played the lead role in the Channel 10 action series "One Zero Zero" as cop Eric Arbel. In 2012 he played a lead role in the drama series "Strike" in yes. In 2013 he hosted the "Extreme Makeover" program on Channel 10.

In 2017, he began playing in HOT3's vampire series "Judah", which was created, written and starred by his friend from the days of "What's up", Zion Baruch.

In 2019 he started playing in the "dubbed" crime series, of yes. In the same year, he played in the series "Eli", in the role of Maurice Cohen, Eli Cohen's brother.

In 2020, he began playing in the suspense series "Manaich" on Channel 11 here, the character of Deputy Chief of Staff Barak Harel and as the Minister of Intelligence in the series "What Happened in Oslo".

Theater 
In 2005, Tamam acted in the play "Mezrich", directed by Itzik Weingarten at the Tzavta Theater, and in the play "Sufa" directed by Yigal Ezrati at the Hebrew-Arab Theater.
In 2006 he appeared in the entertainment show "The Galilee and the Lower", alongside actors Evelyn the Redeemer and Niv Raz.
Since 2010 Tamam has been an actor in the "Cameri Theater": in 2010 he played in the play "Havdalah", from 2012 he plays Casablanca in the new production of the theater, from 2014 he plays the character of "Stanley" in the play "Electric" called Passion "In a joint production of the Cameri Theater and the Habima Theater, on November 6, 2015 he began starring in the play" Lost Honor "alongside Ruthie Asarsai, Sarah von Schwartz and Micha Selector and from December 2016 Tamm plays" Nick Ernstein "in a" funny "musical starring Mia Dagan and directed by Mio Dagan French side.
On Hanukkah 2017, he appeared in the children's musical The Three Musketeers and in the play Ismailia, in which he won critical acclaim. [1] [2]

Since 2018 he has been playing the role of Othello in the play "Othello" at the Cameri Theater and has received rave reviews for this role.

In 2019 he started playing "Closer" alongside Anastasia Payne who played alongside him in the series "Judah", Oz Zehavi and Andrea Schwartz who played alongside him in "Aspur".

Tamam is the presenter of the clothing company ML.

Awards 

2012. Best Actor in Dramatic Series. Israeli Academy of Television.

Personal life 
In September 2013, he married actress Tal Nerubai. In 2017, a daughter was born to the two, after their first child was stillborn a year earlier. The couple had a son in 2021. Amos has a brother Meir Tamam, who is also an actor.

References

External links 
 Amos Tamam on IMDb

1977 births
Living people
People from Ramla
Israeli people of Tunisian-Jewish descent
Jewish Israeli male actors
Israeli male film actors
Israeli male television actors
Israeli male stage actors
21st-century Israeli male actors